Lake Carabundup is an ephemeral salt lake located in the Great Southern region of Western Australia, approximately  south west of Cranbrook and  north east of Rocky Gully. It is located in a watershed between the Kent River and Frankland River catchments.

The broad flats and lakes mostly have lateritic soils. Other major lakes found in the area include Lake Nunijup and Lake Poorrarecup. The flat ancient landscape has weakly-developed drainage. There are rarely any instances of overflow from the area into the river system even after clearing has increased surface water runoff.

The lake is used for swimming, and a drowning occurred there in 2007.

The lake provides habitat for at least three species of shore bird, including the musk duck.

See also

References

Lakes of the Great Southern (Western Australia)
Saline lakes of Western Australia